The Redemption is an Iranian Drama and Crime series. The series is directed by Siroos Moghaddam.

Storyline 
It tells the life story of a girl named Khojasteh who went to Tehran to find out about her husband "Ahmad Reza" after his disappearance. She finds out that Ahmad Reza was working with a person named Parviz Shayesteh and in the absence of Ahmad Reza, he has signed housing contracts with a large number of people, But now he has disappeared and about five hundred creditors have complained about Ahmad Reza and...

Cast 
 Ronak Younesi
 Esmaeil Soltanian
 Pouria Poursorkh
 Atila Pesyani
 Abbas Amiri Moghaddam
 Saba Kamali
 Linda Kiani
 Nafiseh Roshan
 Afshin Sangchap
 Kaveh Khodashenas
 Giti Ghasemi
 Shahrbanoo Mousavi
 Mohammad Omrani
 Zohreh Safavi
 Anahita Afshar
 Abbas Ghazali
 Maryam Soltani
 Shahram Abdoli
 Arash Majidi
 Atefeh Noori
 Maliheh Nikjoomand
 Heshmat Aramideh

References

External links
 

Iranian television series
2010s Iranian television series